The AARP Movies for Grownups Award for Best TV Series is one of the AARP Movies for Grownups Awards presented annually by the AARP. The award honors the best television series in a given year made by or featuring artists over the age of 50.

The first television award given by AARP was titled Best TV Movie, and was given to Hell on Heels: The Battle of Mary Kay in 2003. The category was discontinued after 2006 before returning in 2021 as Best TV Movie/Limited Series alongside three new awards for Best Series, Best Actress, and Best Actor.

Winners and Nominees

2020s

References

TV Series